The Betfair European Tour 2012/2013 – Event 4 (also known as the 2012 Victoria Bulgarian Open) was a professional minor-ranking snooker tournament that took place between 15 and 18 November 2012 at the Princess Hotel in Sofia, Bulgaria. This was the first professional snooker tournament held in Bulgaria.

Tom Ford made the 92nd official maximum break during his last 32 match against Matthew Stevens. This was Ford's second official 147 break and also the fourth maximum break in the 2012/2013 season.

Judd Trump won his ninth professional title by defeating John Higgins 4–0 in the final.

Prize fund and ranking points
The breakdown of prize money and ranking points of the event is shown below:

1 Only professional players can earn ranking points.

Main draw

Preliminary round 
Best of 7 frames

Main rounds

Top half

Section 1

Section 2

Section 3

Section 4

Bottom half

Section 5

Section 6

Section 7

Section 8

Finals

Century breaks

 147, 116, 103  Tom Ford
 140, 122  Paul Davison
 139, 102  Dave Harold
 136, 131  Mark Selby
 133, 106  Andrew Higginson
 132, 118, 107  Mark Davis
 132, 103  Ricky Walden
 132  Robert Milkins
 130  Simon Bedford
 128, 108  Liang Wenbo
 127, 102  Mark Williams
 126  Ken Doherty
 125  Mark Allen

 125  Yu Delu
 124, 113  Aditya Mehta
 123, 121, 119, 115, 107  Judd Trump
 115  Shaun Murphy
 114  Marcus Campbell
 110  John Higgins
 109  Jamie Jones
 104, 100  Neil Robertson
 104  Matthew Stevens
 104  Thepchaiya Un-Nooh
 103  Alan McManus
 101  Barry Hawkins
 100  Fergal O'Brien

References

External links
 

2012
E4
2012 in Bulgarian sport